William Henry Samuel Jones  (8 April 1876 – 4 February 1963) was a British writer, translator, and academic. He was nicknamed Malaria Jones, because of his theory that malaria was instrumental in the downfall of the classical civilizations of Greece and Rome.

Jones was born and raised in Birmingham, and educated at Aston Grammar School and King Edward's School, Birmingham. He entered Selwyn College, Cambridge in 1894, graduating B.A. 1897, M.A. 1902, Litt.D. 1925. He taught Classics at The Perse School in Cambridge, and was appointed a Fellow of St Catharine's College, Cambridge in 1908, serving the college as Dean, Steward and Bursar, and President. He wrote two histories of the college, published in 1936 and 1951.

References

Bibliography

 
 
 
 W. H. S. Jones (1947). The Medical Writings of Anonymus Londinensis. Cambridge: Cambridge University Press.

External links
 

1876 births
1963 deaths
People from Birmingham, West Midlands
People educated at King Edward VI Aston School
People educated at King Edward's School, Birmingham
Alumni of Selwyn College, Cambridge
Fellows of St Catharine's College, Cambridge
Fellows of the British Academy